Taastrup (or Tåstrup) is a Danish railway town or/and suburb of Copenhagen - 18 km west of Copenhagens city centre. The town forms a twin urban area with neighbouring suburb Høje Taastrup, Taastrup rising since 1859 and Høje Taastrup rising west of the town, since the 1970's. The town/suburb development has engulfed the villages of Taastrup Valby, Høje Taastrup, Kragehave and Klovtofte, although Høje Taastrup still has a preserved village character around Høje Taastrup Church. The town is the administrative seat of Høje-Taastrup Municipality, Region Hovedstaden; the seat placed in Taastrup first and since moving to Høje- Taastrup in the beginning of the 1980's. In 2023 a new town hall was opened on 14th February. 

The town is growing closer to the town of Hedehusene, both towns developing towards each other, and both situated in the municipality. The population on 1 January 2022 was 35,238 (excluding Hedehusene) . 

Taastrup took its name from its rise on the lands north of the village of Taastrup Valby. Taastrup Valby means "Valby by (Høje) Taastrup", named "Taastrup Valby" to avoid confusion with other locations like Valby.

Geography
The town is situated approximately halfway between Copenhagen and Roskilde, in proximity to the Copenhagen suburb/new town Albertslund, the town of Hedehusene and the villages of Ishøj Landsby, Sengeløse and Vridsløsemagle.

Notable people 
 Lene Rachel Andersen (born 1968 in Taastrup) a Danish author, indie publisher, economist, futurist and philosopher
 Artillery (formed 1982 in Taastrup) a Danish thrash metal band
 Kristina Kristiansen (born 1989 in Taastrup) a Danish handball player for Nykøbing Falster and the Danish national team
 Jesper Nohrstedt (born 1994) a Danish pop singer, brought up in Taastrup
 Jesper Lindstrøm (born 2000) a Danish footballer, born in Taastrup

Twinned cities
  Oldenburg, Germany 
  Spotorno, Italy

See also
Høje-Taastrup Station
Taastrup Station
Taastrup Water Tower
Treaty of Taastrup
 Danish Technological Institute

References

External links

Municipal seats in the Capital Region of Denmark
Municipal seats of Denmark
Copenhagen metropolitan area
Cities and towns in the Capital Region of Denmark
Høje-Taastrup Municipality